Pseudotolithus senegalensis is a large fish found on the coast of West Africa. It can grow up to a maximum length of 114 cm with a common length of about 50 cm for adults. It is known as cassava croaker or croaker in some parts of West Africa.

The main diet are prawns and epibenthic crustaceans.

Local names

Description
Pseudotolithus senegalensis is congeneric to P. typhus, it has a greyish brown color above that becomes paler beneath. Head has lateral eyes, a lower jaw that projects slightly above the upper jaw and large a mouth. It has 11 spines in its dorsal fin and 2 spines in the anal fin. Allometric growth from larva to adult especially with the head and some fins.

Distribution
Pseudotolithus senegalensis is found in the Eastern Atlantic along the West African coast. It occurs over muddy waters in open shelf. Its northern boundary reaches Morocco and southern boundary is along the Angolan coast.  Prefers temperature water to be warmer that 16°C.

References

Sciaenidae